The Ukraine women's national volleyball team (Zhinocha zbirna Ukrai'ny z volejbolu) represents Ukraine in international women's volleyball competitions and friendly matches. After the dissolution of the Soviet Union the team first competed on the highest level under its own flag at the 1993 European Championship, winning the bronze medal.

Results

Olympic Games
 Champions   Runners-up   Third place   Fourth place

World Championship
 Champions   Runners-up   Third place   Fourth place

European Championship
 Champions   Runners-up   Third place   Fourth place

European League
 Champions   Runners-up   Third place   Fourth place

Squads

1996 Olympic Games

Nataliya Bozhenova 
Yuliya Buyeva 
Olexandra Fomina 
Tetyana Ivanyushkyna 
Olga Kolomiyets 
Alla Kravets 
Olena Kryvonossova 
Vita Mateshik 
Regina Mylosserdova 
Olga Pavlova 
Mariya Polyakova 
Olena Sydorenko
Head coach:Gariy Yegiazarov

2001 European Championship

Alla Kravets
Mariya Aleksandrova
Alexandra Fomina
Olena Sydorenko
Tetyana Ivanyushkina
Regina Miloserdova
Irina Zhukova
Olena Yena
Tetyana Voronina
Yuliya Shelukhina
Nataliya Bozhenova
Maryna Martsynyuk
Head coach:Gariy Yegiazarov

External links
Official website
FIVB profile
CEV profile

Volleyball
National women's volleyball teams
Women's volleyball in Ukraine